Article 196 may refer to:
Offending religious feelings, Article 196 of the Polish criminal code
Article 196 in the Treaty on the Functioning of the European Union
Article 196 in the 1988 Brazilian constitution, which sets out the requirements for Sistema Único de Saúde